Build-A-Bear Workshop, Inc. is an American retailer headquartered in Saint Louis, Missouri that sells teddy bears and other stuffed animals and characters. Customers go through an interactive process in which the stuffed animal of their choice is assembled and tailored to their own preferences during their visit to the store. These preferences include numerous different stuffed animals, along with varying scents, sounds, and outfits. Build-A-Bear Workshop is the largest chain that operates in this style. The company's slogan was "Where Best Friends Are Made" from 1997–2013 when it was changed to "The Most Fun You'll Ever Make." As of April 2019, the company's president/CEO is Sharon Price John.

History

In the mid-1990s, Maxine Clark resigned as president of Payless ShoeSource and started a string of retail stores with interactive experiences similar to her childhood of various events held at department stores. She went to toy factories and children's retail stores looking for ideas. She drew up three plans, then presented them to a panel of children. The build-a-bear concept was selected from the three, as the children were excited about it, and the stuffed animals offered a high-profit margin. Doll shops (known as Build-A-Doll) were also a part of the original business plan.

Clark founded Build-A-Bear in 1997. In 1997, Clark also offered to purchase Basic Brown Bears, who has been operating since 1985 in the do-it-yourself stuffed animals space. Adrienne Weiss Co. of Los Angeles was hired to develop the concept. Clark wanted to expand the store into a chain from the beginning, expecting to open three to five stores in 1998 and six to ten stores in 1999 with the goal of having 100 stores within five years. She opened the first store in the Saint Louis Galleria in Richmond Heights, Missouri. The first year's sales at $377,600 were above projections.

With store opening cost of $500,000 to $700,000 and estimated per store sales at $2 million, Clark quickly found capital firms to invest in for the expansions. Kansas City Equity Partners invested to allow her to open its second store in August 1998 in Overland Park, Kansas. Windsor Capital injected $4.5 million into the company, which allowed for two Chicago area stores to open. With the four stores opened in 1998, the chain had $3.3 million in sales.

Build-A-Bear continued to impress investors, with Walnut Capital Partners investing in 1999 $5 million for expansion. The expansion consisted of opening stores in major cities to bring the chain to 14 stores. The stores were doubling the national mall averages of $350 sales per square foot.

In 1999, the Workshop sent out legal letters with threats of federal lawsuits regarding supposed violations of its trademarks and copyrights to its competitors: Friends 2B Made LLC, Vermont Teddy Bear Co. Inc., and Basic Brown Bears Inc. With Friends 2B Made, the name was similar to Build-A-Bear's slogan "Where best friends are made"; the Workshop demanded that the company stop selling stuffed animals, recall its merchandise, and turn over its customer database and its proceeds. Vermont Teddy Bears had only two out of its three retail locations doing stuffed bears but had closed them down as being too expensive and stepping on its Bear-Gram program. Basic Brown Bears countersued, as the owners believed that Build-A-Bear swiped its information that was under a confidential disclosure agreement when Clark attempted to purchase the company in 1997 and from her visits to their Mall of America location, while Clark asserted that Basic Brown Bears had switched from plastic bags to copy the Workshops' signature cardboard carrier. The company settled with Basic Brown with a payment and a confidentiality agreement that hides any validity to these allegations. Build-A-Bear has 14 other lawsuits to protect 380 patents, trademarks and copyrights.

Public company
Clark took Build-A-Bear Workshop public in 2004. The company opened its first international franchise in Sheffield, England and licensed Hasbro a home bear-stuffing kit.

A few Build-A-Bear Workshop locations began testing the "make-your-own-doll" concept in early 2004. In November 2004, Clark opened the first Friends 2B Made store with this concept in Robinson near Pittsburgh, Pennsylvania followed by a location in Columbus, Ohio on November 19, 2004. Existing mass doll makers had slipping sales, and a number of specialty doll makers entered the market, including eToys' My Twinn and Mattel's American Girl. By October 2006, there were 9 Friends 2B Made stores in operation. By October 1, 2009, they were all either shuttered or converted into expanded Build-A-Bear outlets, with their staff being offered jobs at Bear locations. The Friends 2B Made products display fixtures were removed from about 50 workshop locations.

The Game Factory developed and released a Build-A-Bear Workshop video game for the Nintendo DS platform for Christmas 2007. A Build-A-Bear game for the Nintendo Wii, subtitled A Friend Fur All Seasons, was released in fall 2008. Build-A-Bear released a feature film, available on the iPad through MoPix, in December 2011. From 2011 to 2013, Millennial women began increasing visiting the stores and purchasing accessories, which turn out to be for their pets not prior bear purchases.

In 2008, a virtual game of Build-A-Bear was released where people could explore Bearville and play games online. Players had an inventory with items that they could trade amongst each other. The player could also listen to songs in the game. This game closed in 2015.

Cepia, LLC settled a patent and copyright infringement lawsuit over a color-changing bear against Build-A-Bear in 2013. Also in 2013, founder Maxine Clark retired as CEO, and Sharon Price John took over the position around June. The company licensed My Little Pony and the musical group One Direction. With 400 stores, the company plans to trim 60 underperforming stores over two years. In 2015, a lawsuit sought damages for discriminating against blind people and lack of blind-accessible point-of-sale machines in Build-a-Bear shops.

On July 12, 2018, Build-A-Bear held an event in the United Kingdom, United States and Canada where patrons could pay their child's age for a bear. The relatively low price of the stuffed bears for younger children attracted massive numbers of people, overwhelming the franchise's stores as well as many shopping malls in which Build-A-Bear franchises were located. The event prompted a surge in public awareness of the Build-A-Bear brand, according to a subsequent YouGov poll, nearly all of which was negative. Sharon Price John, president and CEO, apologized; the company stated that those who had waited in line would receive vouchers. In November 2017, the company expanded on its pop up shop locations with the opening of Build-A-Bear Bakeshop temporarily for the holidays in the West County Center near a Workshop location.

In August 2018, the company launched Kabu pre-teen lifestyle brand based on Japanese kawaii-style art starting with three characters: Kabu Pawlette (bunny), Kabu Bearnice (bear) and Kabu Catlynn (kitten). A companion game app, Kabu Pop Party Quest, was also created.

During the 2018 holiday season, Build-A-Bear opened six pop-up pilot shops in Walmart stores. The success of the pilot led to the expansion of Build-A-Bear into a further 25 Walmart locations in 2019.

The company launched a streaming radio station in October 2018. Build-A-Bear Workshop teamed up with Warner Music Group's Arts Music and Warner Chappell Music in July 2019 to partner on a Build-A-Bear music label. Patrick Hughes (founder of Foundation Media Partners) and Harvey Russell (CEO) went on board to guide the label.

With an announcement of having secured a deal with Sony Pictures Worldwide Acquisitions in an August 2019 Q2 earnings report, Build-A-Bear was starting up an in-house production entity, Build-A-Bear Entertainment. The first planned movie is to be a The Honey Girls movie, which releases songs and music videos on its YouTube channel. CEO Price John also indicated two Christmas movies are in development for the Hallmark Channel with the first to be broadcast in winter 2019. RWS Entertainment Group, a custom entertainment, live events and branded experiences production company, formed a partnership with the company. In second-quarter 2020, the company moved its headquarters from Overland to St. Louis.

Product mix
Beyond the built bears, the store carried other merchandise, "Bearaphenalia," to encourage repeat business. These items included candy, greeting cards, jewelry, stationery, stickers, and t-shirts. Also, the stores had a photo booth that converts the pictures into stickers. For the video game Kinectimals: Now with Bears!, it released four bears with scan tags, consisting of Champ Bear, Colorful Hearts Bear, Endless Hearts Teddy and Peace & Hearts Bear.

References

External links
 Official website

Companies listed on the New York Stock Exchange
Companies based in St. Louis
American companies established in 1997
Retail companies established in 1997
Toy retailers of the United States
Teddy bear manufacturers
1997 establishments in Missouri
2004 initial public offerings